Malakai may refer to:

People
Variant spelling of the name of the Hebrew prophet Malachi
Malakai Black (born 1985), ring name of Dutch professional wrestler Tom Büdgen
Malakai Fakatoufifita, styled Lord Tuʻilakepa, Tongan noble, politician, and Member of the Legislative Assembly of Tonga
Malakai Fekitoa (born 1992), Tongan born New Zealand rugby union player
Malakai Kaunivalu, Fijian rugby league player
Malakai Mars (born 1998), English footballer
Malakai Ravulo (born 1983), Fijian rugby union player
Malakai Tiwa (born 1986), Fiji footballer

Entertainment
 Earlier name of Malachai, a two-piece band from Bristol, England
 Malakai Makaisson, a dwarf character in Warhammer Fantasy
 Malakai (a.k.a. #4 D.E.O.S. Malakai), AI space probe from the game Dark Fall II: Lights Out

Other 
 Variant transliteration of Malahai, a historical headgear originated in Central Asia
 Malakai, a variant spelling of Malakal, a town in Upper Nile, South Sudan

See also 
 Malachi (disambiguation)
 Malachy (disambiguation)
 Malachai (disambiguation)